Shipwrecked Max (German: Rendezvous im Paradies, Swedish: Skeppsbrutne Max) is a 1936 Austrian-Swedish drama film directed by Fritz Schulz and Sigurd Wallén and starring Max Hansen, Gull-Maj Norin and Brita Appelgren. It was produced in separate German and Swedish-language versions. Such Multiple-language version were common in the first few years of sound film before dubbing became more widespread.

It was shot at the Sundbyberg Studios in Stockholm The film's sets were designed by the art directors Bertil Duroj and Bibi Lindström.

Cast

Swedish version
 Max Hansen as	Max Mattsson 
 Björn Berglund as 	Sten Sergius - pilot
 Gull-Maj Norin as 	Ann-Kathrine
 Brita Appelgren as 	Bibi
 Greta Wenneberg as 	Karin
 Ragnar Falck as 	Olle - pianist
 Gösta Kjellertz as Bo Sanger - Bibi's brother
 Ingrid Wiksjö as 	Operetta primadonna
 Carl-Gunnar Wingård as 	Director Köhler
 Elof Ahrle as 	Publicity Expert
 John Norrman as 	Theater Director
 Viran Rydkvist as 	Julia - Bibi's maid
 Helge Andersson as 	Guest
 Gösta Bodin as 	Stagehand
 Emil Fjellström as  Fisherman
 Richard Lindström as 	Bureau chief
 Einar Molin as 	Operetta singer
 Rutger Nygren as 	Operetta singer
 Karl-Magnus Thulstrup as 	Editor Johansson
 Rolf von Nauckhoff as 	Waiter

German version
 Max Hansen as Hans Madsen
 Alf von Sievers as 	Sergius - pilot 
 Lizzi Waldmüller as 	Bibi 
 Adolf E. Licho as 	Köhler
 Georgia Lind as 	Daisy Köhler
 Annemarie Sörensen as 	Karin
 Emil Fjellström as 	Axel Axelsson

References

Bibliography 
 Larsson, Mariah & Marklund, Anders (ed.). Swedish Film: An Introduction and Reader. Nordic Academic Press, 2010.
 Qvist, Per Olov & von Bagh, Peter. Guide to the Cinema of Sweden and Finland. Greenwood Publishing Group, 2000.

External links 
 

1936 films
Swedish comedy films
Austrian comedy films
1936 comedy films
1930s Swedish-language films
1930s German-language films
Films directed by Fritz Schulz
Films directed by Sigurd Wallén
1930s Swedish films